Garot is a surname. Notable people with the surname include:

 Guillaume Garot (born 1966), French politician
 Martin Garot (born 1988), French footballer
 Philippe Garot (born 1948), Belgian footballer and manager

Surnames of French origin